The infield shift in baseball is a defensive realignment from the standard positions to blanket one side of the field or another. Used primarily against left-handed batters, it is designed to protect against base hits pulled hard into the gaps between the fielders on one side. Originally called the Williams shift, it has periodically been referred to as the Boudreau shift or Ortiz shift since then. After shifts became very effective in reducing base hits by Major League Baseball (MLB) batters, MLB and the Major League Baseball Players Association (MLBPA) agreed to potentially begin restricting shifts starting in the 2023 season.

History in Major League Baseball
The infield shift strategy is often associated with Ted Williams, but it was actually first employed against Cy Williams during the 1920s. Cy Williams, a left-handed outfielder with the Chicago Cubs (1912–1917) and Philadelphia Phillies (1918–1930), was second only to Babe Ruth in major league career home runs from 1923 to 1928. Opposing defenses would shift "practically to the entire right side" when he batted.

The shift was later used against Ted Williams of the Boston Red Sox during the 1946 World Series, as a defensive gimmick by St. Louis Cardinals manager Eddie Dyer to psych out and hopefully contain the Boston slugger. It was devised by Cleveland Indians manager Lou Boudreau between games of a doubleheader in July 1946 to halt Williams' hot hitting. In his book Player-Manager, Boudreau wrote, "I have always regarded the Boudreau Shift as a psychological, rather than a tactical, victory."

The shift has subsequently been employed to thwart extreme pull hitters (mostly those batting left-handed), such as Barry Bonds, Fred McGriff, Ryan Howard, Jason Giambi, David Ortiz, Jim Thome, Adam Dunn, Mark Teixeira,Matt Carpenter, Joey Gallo, and Anthony Rizzo.

Implementing the shift

Typically the third baseman moves to his left where the shortstop plays; the shortstop plays to the right of second base; the second baseman plays between first and second base, and usually out on the grass in shallow right field; the center fielder plays in right-center; and the first baseman and right fielder hug the foul line. Sometimes, the third baseman, rather than the shortstop, will play to the right of second base, allowing the shortstop (who is usually the team's best infielder) to remain near their usual position. While this is the most common type of defensive shift seen in baseball, there are numerous variations that can be implemented according to the hitting ability of the batter. For example, an effective defensive shift against Joe Mauer would have the infield shifted for a pull-happy left hander, and the outfield shifted for a pull-happy right-hander, due to Mauer's tendency to pull nearly all of his ground balls, and hit nearly all of his fly balls to the opposite field.

Ortiz shift 
The Ortiz shift consists of a typical infield defense, however the shortstop and second baseman move to the outfield between first and second base while the left and center fielder are moved towards the right side of the field with the third baseman going to the left side of the outfield.

Joe Maddon, as manager of the Tampa Bay Devil Rays, had an upcoming series against the Boston Red Sox in 2006 and was considering a strategy on how to defend against left-handed designated hitter David Ortiz. Maddon was cycling on an exercise bike as he looked at Ortiz's sabermetrics and noticed that Ortiz mostly hit to right field and the majority of those hits landed in the outfield. Maddon created the Ortiz Shift to counter it. The shift was first used in the Devil Rays' 7–4 loss to the Red Sox on 18 April 2006 at Fenway Park. Though Ortiz was 2-for-5 in that game, the tactic was successful and a number of other clubs employed it against Ortiz, with his batting average dropping from .300 over 2004–2006 to .265 midway through the 2006 season.

Baseball historian Bill James—who worked for the Red Sox at the time—criticized the Ortiz shift as only working for ground balls and not for home runs, which he described as Ortiz's true danger. Though the shift was mostly used against Ortiz, it has been used elsewhere in baseball.

Defensive vulnerability
As the infield shift leaves some areas less covered than others, a batter who hits toward those areas may obtain better results than against an un-shifted infield. For example, a batter can bunt towards third base, when the third baseman is positioned elsewhere. Boston's Ortiz started to hit more balls towards the left side of the field, taking advantage of the lack of defenders in left field. A stark example occurred in a 1970 game between the Philadelphia Phillies and the San Francisco Giants: Giant Willie McCovey bunted hard down the third base line when the shift was on. With no one covering third,  Willie Mays, on first at the time, came all the way around to score, while McCovey reached second for a double.

Infield shifts can also provide base running opportunities to the batting team. A notable example occurred in Game 4 of the 2009 World Series: with switch hitter Mark Teixeira of the New York Yankees batting left-handed, and the Philadelphia Phillies implementing an infield shift, baserunner Johnny Damon stole second base and then continued on to third base in one continuous play, as there was no fielder on the left side of the infield. Damon subsequently scored what proved to be the winning run of the game.

Anti-shift sentiment
As early as 2015, the Commissioner of Baseball considered banning the shift, with some MLB managers expressing agreement, although there was no consensus on such an idea. In 2019, the independent Atlantic League of Professional Baseball, as part of an agreement with MLB to test experimental rules, significantly restricted the shift by requiring two infielders to be positioned on either side of second base.

As part of a new collective bargaining agreement (CBA) reached after the 2021–22 lockout, MLB can potentially regulate infield shifts starting with the 2023 season, with the league's 11-member competition committee empowered to approve such a change, along with other potential changes such as a pitch clock. In Minor League Baseball during 2022, shift restrictions were tested at the Double-A and Class A levels (four players required to be in the infield, two on each side of second base) with a further experiment in the Florida State League starting in July (a wedge-shaped exclusion area around second base).

See also
 Baseball positioning
 Fielding restrictions (cricket)

Notes

References

Further reading
 
 
 
 

Baseball strategy
Baseball terminology